is the debut single by the Japanese female idol group Keyakizaka46. It was released in Japan on 6 April 2016 on the label Sony Records.

The center position in the choreography for the title song is held by Yurina Hirate.

The single was number-one on the Oricon Weekly Singles Chart, with 261,580 copies sold, which is the No.1 debut song for female artist. It was also number-one on the Billboard Japan weekly chart  and number-ten in yearly chart. It also has spent a whopping 149 weeks on the chart, which makes it sixth among the most weeks spent on the chart

Release history 
In February 2016 it was revealed that Keyakizaka46 would release their first single on April 6, 2016. Its title was later revealed to be "Silent Majority". It was also revealed that the title song would be used in a TV commercial for a mobile application named Mechakari.

The single was released in four versions: Type-A, Type-B, Type-C, and a "Regular edition". All versions, except the regular edition, include a DVD with music videos. The cover photo was taken in the Shibuya River.

Music video 
The choreography for the title track was created by Takahiro Ueno.

Track listings 
All lyrics written by Yasushi Akimoto,  all music composed by Bugbear.

Type-A

Type-B

Type-C

Regular Edition

Members

"Silent Majority" 
Center: Yurina Hirate
 1st row: Rika Watanabe, Miyu Suzumoto, Yurina Hirate, Yui Imaizumi, Yui Kobayashi
 2nd row: Mizuho Habu, Rika Ozeki, Akane Moriya, Yūka Sugai, Manaka Shida, Risa Watanabe
 3rd row: Fuyuka Saito, Nana Oda, Rina Uemura, Nanako Nagasawa, Minami Koike, Shiori Sato, Aoi Harada, Nanami Yonetani, Nijika Ishimori

"Te o Tsunaide Kaerōka" 
 Nijika Ishimori, Yui Imaizumi, Rina Uemura, Rika Ozeki, Nana Oda, Minami Koike, Yui Kobayashi, Fuyuka Saito, Shiori Sato, Manaka Shida, Yuuka Sugai, Miyu Suzumoto, Nanako Nagasawa, Mizuho Habu, Aoi Harada, Yurina Hirate, Akane Moriya, Nanami Yonetani, Rika Watanabe, Risa Watanabe

"Yamanotesen" 
 Yurina Hirate

"Shibuyagawa" 
 Yui Imaizumi, Yui Kobayashi

"Noriokureta Bus" 
Center: Neru Nagahama (Hiragana Keyakizaka46)

 Back dancer: Yui Imaizumi, Yui Kobayashi, Miyu Suzumoto, Yurina Hirate, Rika Watanabe（Keyakizaka46）

"Kimi ga Inai" 
 Nijika Ishimori, Yui Imaizumi, Rina Uemura, Rika Ozeki, Nana Oda, Minami Koike, Yui Kobayashi, Fuyuka Saito, Shiori Sato, Manaka Shida, Yuuka Sugai, Miyu Suzumoto, Nanako Nagasawa, Mizuho Habu, Aoi Harada, Yurina Hirate, Akane Moriya, Nanami Yonetani, Rika Watanabe, Risa Watanabe

Chart and certifications

Weekly charts

Year-end charts

References

Further reading

External links 
 Discography on the official website of Keyakizaka46
 List of videos included on the album's accompanying DVDs on YouTube

Keyakizaka46 songs
2016 debut singles
Songs with lyrics by Yasushi Akimoto
2016 songs
Oricon Weekly number-one singles
Billboard Japan Hot 100 number-one singles
Sony Music Entertainment Japan singles